AmericInn by Wyndham is an American hotel franchise founded in 1984 in the suburban Twin Cities. The chain is a mid-priced, limited-service hotel. As of December 31, 2018, it consists of 204 locations with 12,072 rooms throughout the United States, with the majority located in the Midwestern United States. The chain is a division of Wyndham Hotels & Resorts.

History 

The AmericInn Franchise was founded by Jim Graves, and the first location opened in 1984. By 1990, there were more than 20 AmericInn properties located in Minnesota and Wisconsin. In 1994, AmericInn began franchising with the help of Wyman Nelson, an entrepreneur known for expanding the Perkins Restaurant and Bakery chain in the 1960s and 1970s.

Expansion outside the Midwestern United States began in 2000. AmericInn has 240 motels, with more than 80 percent of its locations in the Upper Midwest.

Hotel details 
Rooms are built with masonry block, sound deadening foam and heavy drywall between rooms, as well as concrete slabs, to minimize noise within rooms.

Wyndham Hotels & Resorts bought the brand in July 2017.

References

External links

Companies based in Minnesota
Hotel chains in the United States
Hotels established in 1984
Wyndham brands
1984 establishments in Minnesota
2017 mergers and acquisitions